Ilaria Spirito (born 20 February 1994 in Savona) is an Italian volleyball player for the Italian national team.

Career 
She participated at the 2015 European Games, 2016 FIVB Volleyball World Grand Prix, and 2018 FIVB Volleyball Women's Nations League.

References

External links 
 Ilaria Spirito at the International Volleyball Federation
 Ilaria Spirito at the Italian Women's Volleyball League
 

1994 births
Living people
Italian women's volleyball players
Volleyball players at the 2015 European Games
European Games competitors for Italy
Competitors at the 2018 Mediterranean Games
Mediterranean Games competitors for Italy